Ricardo Peláez Linares (born 14 March 1963) is a Mexican former professional footballer and former Director of Football for Liga MX club Guadalajara.

As a player, Peláez made his debut with Club América in 1985, before moving to Necaxa in 1987 and becoming a mainstay for the club, making over 300 appearances and scoring 138 goals, making him the club's all-time leading goalscorer. He had a second stint with América in 1997, and transferred a year later to Guadalajara before retiring in 2000. Peláez also represented the Mexico national team at the 1998 FIFA World Cup.

Following his retirement, Peláez became a commentator for Televisa Deportes. In November 2011 he became Sporting President for Club América. From October 2013 to July 2014 he was the Sporting Director of the Mexico national team, returning to América immediately following the FIFA World Cup in Brazil. He left his position as sporting president in April 2017.

Club career
Ricardo Peláez Linares started his career as an accountant. After finishing his studies in accounting, Ricardo started to work doing public accountancy which he believed was something extremely boring and tiresome. Football being his hobby and passion, he decided to go for trials at Club América. He was 23 when the club headhunters recognized his talents and decided to place him in the first team. He scored his first goal for America in the 1985 Prode Final, in which America won.

He has claimed to be a boyhood fan of América, and Club Necaxa. He is the leading scorer in Necaxa's history with 138 goals made during his tenure with the team from 1987 to 1997.

Peláez returned to América for one year after which he joined Guadalajara in the winter of 1998. In 2000, he was forced into retirement due to knee injuries at age 35. Peláez scored 172 goals and registered 40 assists during his career.

He was commemorated in Necaxa's new facilities in Aguascalientes when a training field was named after him.

International career
Peláez was part of the Mexico national team at the 1998 FIFA World Cup, scoring two goals in the tournament. Peláez scored the equalizer against South Korea in a 3–1 win. Peláez scored his second goal of the tournament in a 2–2 draw against the Netherlands. Overall Peláez capped 43 times for Mexico and scored 16 goals.

International goals

Executive

Club América
On 8 November 2011, following the departure of Michel Bauer as president, it was announced that Peláez was named the new Sporting President of Club América as part of a complete organizational restructuring. His first act as president was the signing of Miguel Herrera as the club's new manager.

Under Peláez's presidency, América has qualified to the playoffs every season, reaching the league final four times (winning the 2013 Clausura and 2014 Apertura tournaments), as well as winning the CONCACAF Champions' League twice (winning the 2014–15 and 2015–16 editions).

Cruz Azul
Peláez was announced as Director of Football for Cruz Azul on 7 May 2018, replacing Eduardo de la Torre. Peláez signed a two year contract with the club and was presented on 9 May 2018. In his first season with Cruz Azul, the team reached the Copa MX final, defeating Monterrey 2–0 to win the cup.

Guadalajara
Following much speculation, Peláez was announced as Guadalajara's new Director of Football beginning in the 2020 Clausura. On October 11 2022 Chivas terminated the contract of sporting director Ricardo Pelaez after a 5-4 loss on penalties to Puebla in the first round of the Liga MX playoffs.

Outside football
In 2004, Peláez became a commentator for football matches on Mexican television station Televisa. Pelaez has also lent his voice alongside Enrique Bermúdez to be the Spanish language commentators for the FIFA videogames.

From September 2017 until May 2018, he worked as an analyst for ESPN Deportes and ESPN Mexico.

Honours
América
Mexican Primera División: Prode-85

Necaxa
Mexican Primera División: 1994–95, 1995–96
Copa México: 1994–95
CONCACAF Cup Winners' Cup: 1994
Campeón de Campeones: 1995

Mexico
CONCACAF Gold Cup: 1996

References

External links
 

1963 births
Living people
Mexican footballers
1998 FIFA World Cup players
Club América footballers
Liga MX players
CONCACAF Gold Cup-winning players
Mexico international footballers
Association football forwards
1996 CONCACAF Gold Cup players